Italomat–Dogo is an Argentinian UCI Continental cycling team founded in 2014.

The team disbanded at the end of the 2017 season.

Team roster

References

UCI Continental Teams (America)
Cycling teams established in 2014
Cycling teams based in Argentina